W.A.S.P. is the debut studio album by the American heavy metal band W.A.S.P., released August 17, 1984. The album has been known under three different names; the spine of the original European vinyl release had Winged Assassins printed on it, while early cassette releases of the album had the name of the album's first track, "I Wanna Be Somebody", printed in bold letters on the cover. The album is officially entitled simply W.A.S.P., which it is typically referred to as.

Overview
Prior to its original release, the controversial track "Animal (Fuck Like a Beast)" was deleted from the album. The Parents Music Resource Center had labeled the song as one of its "Filthy 15", songs that the group determined to be morally objectionable. Capitol Records subsequently bowed to pressure and pulled the song. The band released it as a single in the UK in 1984 on the indie label Music for Nations, and the single subsequently became a highly sought after item in North America as an import. The song was reinstated on the album with the 1998 reissue.

The song "I Wanna Be Somebody", released as the album's second single with accompanying music video, was so popular that VH1 later placed it in their list of the "Top 100 Hard Rock Songs" of all time. "L.O.V.E. Machine" dates back to Lawless' pre-W.A.S.P. band Circus Circus, who frequently played the song live but never recorded it.

Several of the album's songs have been covered by other bands. "Sleeping (In the Fire)" has been covered by Tiamat and Anders Manga, "Hellion" by Children of Bodom and In Aeternum, "L.O.V.E. Machine" by Fallen Man, Lullacry, Fozzy and Alghazanth, "I Wanna Be Somebody" by Sentenced, Catamenia, Witchery, Avulsed and Gates of Ishtar, and "The Torture Never Stops" by the death metal group Torture Division.

The song "Tormentor" was heard in the films The Dungeonmaster (1984) and TerrorVision (1986).

Track listings
All songs written by Blackie Lawless, except where noted.

Personnel
W.A.S.P.
Blackie Lawless – lead vocals, bass, producer
Chris Holmes – lead & rhythm guitars
Randy Piper – lead & rhythm guitars, backing vocals
Tony Richards – drums, backing vocals

Production
Mike Varney – producer
Duane Baron – engineer, mixing
Stephen M. Fontano – engineer
Jim Scott, Hanspeter Huber – assistant engineers
David Tarling – pre-production

Charts

Album

Singles

Certifications

References

W.A.S.P. albums
1984 debut albums
Albums produced by Mike Varney
Capitol Records albums
Albums produced by Blackie Lawless